Mervin Kuryluk (born August 10, 1937) is a former professional ice hockey player.  He played two playoff games with the Chicago Black Hawks of the National Hockey League during the 1961-62 Stanley Cup playoffs.

External links

1936 births
Living people
Canadian ice hockey left wingers
Chicago Blackhawks players
Ice hockey people from Saskatchewan
Sault Thunderbirds players
Sportspeople from Yorkton
St. Louis Braves (EPHL) players